Chart Attack was a Canadian online music publication. Formerly a monthly print magazine called Chart, it was published from 1991 to 2009. While the web version appears to be available online, the domain is now used as a popular media outlet, similar to BuzzFeed, almost entirely excluding music. Content ceased to be updated from mid 2017 to 2019 when owner Channel Zero laid off the site's staff.

History and profile
Launched in 1991 as National Chart, the magazine was started by York University students Edward Skira and Nada Laskovski as a tipsheet and airplay chart for campus radio stations in Canada. The magazine soon grew to include interviews, CD reviews and other features. National Chart was considered an internal publication for the National Campus and Community Radio Association, Canada's association of campus radio stations, and was not available as a newsstand title.

When Skira and Laskovski graduated, they incorporated Chart as an independent magazine, and began to pursue national newsstand distribution. Although it was no longer an NCRA publication, many campus radio stations continued to file airplay reports for the magazine's Top 50 chart even though its status as the official NCRA chart was transferred to the new publication !earshot.

The magazine's primary focus was Canadian alternative rock and indie rock, although they profiled important international acts, and rap and pop music acts as well. At its peak, the magazine had a press run of 40,000 copies per issue, making it the largest paid circulation music magazine in Canada in its era.

The magazine ceased publishing a print edition in 2009, continuing as a web-only publication. The website briefly suspended publication in summer 2011, but its acquisition by andPOP, a Canadian entertainment news website, was announced on November 1, 2011. In 2013, andPop was in turn acquired by Channel Zero.

The site laid off its staff in 2017.

Reader polls
In 1996, 2000 and 2005, the magazine conducted polls of readers, musicians and music industry professionals to determine the 50 best Canadian albums and songs of all time. There were 25 albums and 18 songs which ranked in the top 50 in all three polls.

Top 50 albums

Top 50 songs

References

External links

Website

1991 establishments in Ontario
2009 disestablishments in Ontario
Canadian music websites
Channel Zero (company)
Defunct magazines published in Canada
Magazines established in 1991
Magazines disestablished in 2009
Magazines published in Toronto
Music magazines published in Canada
Online magazines published in Canada
Online music magazines published in Canada